The 20th District of the Pennsylvania House of Representatives is located in Allegheny County in southwestern Pennsylvania, covering parts of the city of Pittsburgh and its northern suburbs. It has been represented by Emily Kinkead since 2021.

District profile
Pennsylvania's 20th District is located in Allegheny County and includes the following areas:

Avalon
Bellevue
Pittsburgh (part)
Ward 26 (part)
Division 12 
Division 13 
Division 15 
Ward 27 (part) 
Division 01 
Division 02 
Division 03 
Division 04 
Division 05 
Division 07 
Division 08
 Ross Township
 West View

Representatives

Previous elections

References

External links
http://www.pahouse.com/Ravenstahl/

Government of Allegheny County, Pennsylvania
20